Ludwig Boltzmann was an Austrian physicist famous for his founding contributions in the fields of statistical mechanics and statistical thermodynamics.

Boltzmann may also refer to:

 24712 Boltzmann, a main-belt asteroid
 the Boltzmann brain, a thought experiment
 Boltzmann constant
 Boltzmann (crater), an old lunar crater
 Boltzmann distribution
 Boltzmann equation
 Boltzmann's entropy formula
 Boltzmann relation
 Stefan–Boltzmann law
 Stefan–Boltzmann constant